"All the Tired Horses" is a song written by Bob Dylan, released on his 1970 double album Self Portrait.

The song is the first track on the album. It is most notable for its absence of Dylan's singing. It consists of a small choir of female voices (Hilda Harris, Albertine Robinson, and Maeretha Stewart) repeating the same two lines

All the tired horses in the sun
How'm I s'posed to get any ridin' done? Hmm.

to the same melody for 3 minutes and 14 seconds, with varying instrumental accompaniment. In the key of C major, this song consists musically of the chord structure I-vi-iii-V, repeated throughout. This translates in the given key to C-Am-Em-G.

All the Tired Horses was used in the 2001 film Blow.

Cover versions
The Sports: The Sports Play Dylan (and Donovan) (1981)
Tim Heidecker & The Earth Is A Man (2012) (single)
Lisa O'Neill (2022)
Anna Calvi (2022)

References

Further reading
Don Giller and Ed Lozano. The Definitive Bob Dylan Songbook. Amsco Publications, 2003.
Clinton Heylin. Revolution in the Air: The Songs of Bob Dylan, 1957-1973.. Chicago Review Press. 2009.
Oliver Trager. Keys to the Rain: The Definitive Bob Dylan Encyclopedia. Billboard Books, 2004.

Songs written by Bob Dylan
Bob Dylan songs
The Sports songs
1970 songs
Song recordings produced by Bob Johnston